Grand Bayou Reservoir is a lake in Fairview Alpha, Louisiana.

References

Red River Parish, Louisiana
Reservoirs in Louisiana